Music to Crash Your Car To: Vol. 1 is the fifth compilation album by the American glam metal band Mötley Crüe. It contains their first four albums in their reissued format (i.e. including the bonus tracks): Too Fast for Love, Shout at the Devil, Theatre of Pain and Girls, Girls, Girls.

As an added bonus, the box set features the original mix of Too Fast for Love as released on Leathür Records, as well as an illustrated inlay. Music to Crash Your Car To: Vol. 2 was also released, containing songs from the group's later years. The album has been ridiculed in the press for the title, considering the legal troubles of Vince Neil with regards to his drunk driving and vehicular manslaughter charge.

Track listing
Disc 1
"Live Wire" (Leathür Original Mix)
"Public Enemy #1" (Leathür Original Mix)
"Take Me to the Top" (Leathür Original Mix)
"Merry-Go-Round" (Leathür Original Mix)
"Piece of Your Action" (Leathür Original Mix)
"Starry Eyes" (Leathür Original Mix)
"Stick to Your Guns" (Leathür Original Mix)
"Come On and Dance" (Leathür Original Mix)
"Too Fast for Love" (Leathür Original Mix)
"On With the Show" (Leathür Original Mix)
"Live Wire"
"Come On and Dance"
"Public Enemy #1"
"Merry-Go-Round"
"Take Me to the Top"
"Piece of Your Action"
"Starry Eyes"
"Too Fast for Love"
"On With the Show"

Disc 2
"Toast of the Town"
"Tonight"
"Too Fast for Love" (Alternate Intro)
"Merry-Go-Round" (Live)
"In the Beginning"
"Shout at the Devil"
"Looks That Kill"
"Bastard"
"God Bless the Children of the Beast"
"Helter Skelter"
"Red Hot"
"Too Young to Fall in Love"
"Knock 'Em Dead Kid"
"Ten Seconds to Love"
"Danger"
"Shout at the Devil" (Demo)
"Looks That Kill" (Demo)
"Hotter Than Hell" (Demo)
"I Will Survive"
"Too Young to Fall in Love" (Demo)

Disc 3
"City Boys Blues"
"Smokin' in the Boys Room"
"Louder Than Hell"
"Keep Your Eye on the Money"
"Home Sweet Home"
"Tonight (We Need a Lover)"
"Use It or Lose It"
"Save Our Souls"
"Raise Your Hands to Rock"
"Fight for Your Rights"
"Home Sweet Home" (Demo)
"Smokin' in the Boys Room" (Alternate Guitar Solo)
"City Boy Blues" (Demo)
"Home Sweet Home" (Instrumental Rough Mix)
"Keep Your Eye on the Money" (Demo)
Tommy's Drum Piece from Cherokee Studios

Disc 4
"Wild Side"
"Girls, Girls, Girls"
"Dancing on Glass"
"Bad Boy Boogie"
"Nona"
"Five Years Dead"
"All in the Name Of..."
"Sumthin' for Nuthin'"
"You're All I Need"
"Jailhouse Rock" (Live)
"Girls, Girls, Girls" (Tom Werman & Band Intro—Rough Instrumental Mix)
"Wild Side" (Instrumental—Rough Mix of Instrumental Track)
"Rodeo"
"Nona" (Instrumental Demo Idea)
"All in the Name Of..." (Live)

References

External links

2003 compilation albums
Mötley Crüe compilation albums